Vitreolina is a genus of very small parasitic sea snails,  marine gastropod mollusks or micromollusks in  the Eulimidae family.
 
This genus was first described by Monterosato in 1884. He proposed it as a section in the family Eulimidae for some of the Mediterranean species. It contains the small vitreous species without internal varices, 
with curved spire and slightly obtuse apex.

Species
Species within the genus Vitreolina include:

Vitreolina alayoi Espinosa, Ortea & Magaña, 2001
Vitreolina antiflexa Monterosato, 1884
Vitreolina arcuata C. B. Adams, 1850
Vitreolina aurata Hirase, 1920
Vitreolina bermudezi Pilsbry & Aguayo, 1933
Vitreolina chondrocidaricola Warén, B. L. Burch & T. A. Burch, 1984
Vitreolina cionella Monterosato, 1878
Vitreolina colini Espinosa & Ortea, 2006
Vitreolina columbiana Bartsch, 1917
Vitreolina commensalis Tate, 1898
Vitreolina conica C. B. Adams, 1850
Vitreolina curva Monterosato, 1874
 Vitreolina drangai (Hertlein & Strong, 1951)
Vitreolina edwardsi Cotton & Godfrey, 1932
Vitreolina hawaiiensis Warén, B. L. Burch & T. A. Burch, 1984
Vitreolina inconspicua Turton, 1932
Vitreolina incurva Bucquoy, Dautzenberg & Dollfus, 1883 (Type taxon)
Vitreolina knudseni Bouchet & Warén, 1986
Vitreolina macra Bartsch, 1917
Vitreolina maracuya Espinosa, Ortea & Magaña, 2001
Vitreolina parfaiti de Folin, 1887
Vitreolina perminima Jeffreys, 1883
Vitreolina philippi de Rayneval & Ponzi, 1854
Vitreolina rhaeba Melvill, 1906
Vitreolina subconica E. A. Smith, 1890
 Vitreolina titubans Berry, 1956
Vitreolina wareni Rehder, 1980
Vitreolina yod Carpenter, 1857

Species brought into synonymy
Vitreolina akauni Habe, 1952: synonym of Eulitoma akauni (Habe, 1952)
 Vitreolina dautzenbergi (Pallary, 1900): synonym of Curveulima dautzenbergi (Pallary, 1900)
 Vitreolina devians Monterosato, 1884: synonym of Curveulima devians (Monterosato, 1884)
 Vitreolina incurvata [sic]: synonym of Vitreolina incurva (Bucquoy, Dautzenberg & Dollfus, 1883)
Vitreolina levantina Oliverio, Buzzurro & Villa, 1994: synonym of Melanella levantina (Oliverio, Buzzurro & Villa, 1994)
Vitreolina nishimurai Habe, 1958 : synonym of Eulitoma nishimurai (Habe, 1958) 
 Vitreolina petitiana (Brusina, 1869): synonym of Melanella petitiana (Brusina, 1869)
 Vitreolina philippii (Rayneval & Ponzi, 1854): synonym of Vitreolina philippi (de Rayneval & Ponzi, 1854)
 Taxon inquirendum
 Vitreolina kowiensis (Turton, 1932)

References

 Monterosato T. A. (di) (1884). Nomenclatura generica e specifica di alcune conchiglie mediterranee. Palermo, Virzi, 152 pp

External links 

Marine Species Identification Portal

 
Eulimidae